Rick Gates (born October 18, 1956) is an Internet pioneer mostly known because he organized The Internet Hunt and raised the ideas of Interpedia. He studied at the Graduate Library School at the University of Arizona.

The Internet Hunt
On 31 Aug 1992 he started the monthly competition The Internet Hunt where ten questions had to be answered with Internet sources exclusively. Tools of investigation were  Usenet, Telnet, FTP, and, Archie, Jughead, Veronica, and Gopher. When the World Wide Web became more popular, the competition was closed in October 1994. NCSA Mosaic, the first popular Web browser was first published in April 1993.

Interpedia
On October 22, 1993, Gates proposed in the Usenet newsgroup alt.internet.services to collaboratively create an encyclopaedia on the Internet. From this idea the Interpedia project evolved which is known as precursor to Wikipedia. The original proposal was made by Rick Gates in the posting Internet AS Encyclopedia on October 31, 1993 of Douglas P. Wilson in alt.bbs.internet.

Net Assets
In 1995, Rick Gates moved to Oregon where he worked on developing a Web-based software and an Internet training company, Net Assets. Rick was also employed as an adjunct professor, teaching at a distance for the University of Arizona School of Information Resources & Library Science and the Rochester Institute of Technology through the late 1990s. In 2005, he retired from Net Assets.

References

External links
 

Living people
1956 births
Internet pioneers
University of Arizona alumni
Rochester Institute of Technology faculty